Happiness Is the Road is Marillion's 15th studio album, released in 2008 as two separate album-length volumes respectively titled Essence and The Hard Shoulder. The overall playing time is 110 minutes (116 including a hidden track), taking it to double album length. 

The album sees Marillion experimenting with a host of new instruments, including dulcimers, glockenspiels, a harmonium, French horns and even sleigh bells, a harp and zither. The title track "Happiness Is the Road" was inspired by Eckhart Tolle's book The Power of Now. The album's artwork was created by the Spanish artist Antonio Seijas in co-operation with Marillion's long-time designer Carl Glover.

Formats
It is available in various formats: Two separate jewel case CDs, high-quality (256 kbit/s) download (by purchasing "Front Row Club" credits at their web page), standard-quality download (128 kbit/s) (legally available on file-sharing networks), and a "deluxe campaign edition" containing both CDs and special artwork (see below). In most of the world, initially the physical formats were only available via mail-order from the band's website; only in the US and Poland has the album been available in retail shops from the start. However, when only about a third of the expected sales were achieved via mail-order, Marillion decided to release a worldwide retail version distributed by EMI. This version has been available since 2 February 2009.

In December 2009, the album was made available on vinyl, consisting of two double-LPs pressed at 45rpm rather than the usual 33 and 1/3rpm. Both LPs were specifically mastered for vinyl and only 2000 copies of each (Volume 1: Essence and Volume 2: The Hard Shoulder) were pressed. The track listing on Volume 1: Essence was identical to the CD, but the track listing in Volume 2: The Hard Shoulder differed greatly from the CD and included hitherto unreleased live versions of "Nothing Fills the Hole" and "Woke Up" to close the LP.

On October 6, 2017, after being long out of print on vinyl, both volumes were re-released on 180 gram vinyl by Madfish, this time with the usual 33 and 1/3rpm.

Promotional activities
The recording was financed by pre-ordering, which asked fans to order about a year in advance. In return, buyers would receive a special edition box-set with book-style special artwork containing both volumes. The band had used the same approach with the albums Anoraknophobia (2001) and Marbles (2004). As with Marbles, the names of everyone who pre-ordered before a certain date are listed in the special edition.

The first single released ("Whatever Is Wrong With You") was released as a download, and fans were invited to enter a competition to make their own video to the track. Videos were to be uploaded to YouTube and the video with the most views by 1 December 2008 won £5000. In addition, there was a further £5000 prize for the video judged by the band to be the best.

Marillion made the album available for free on peer-to-peer file sharing networks as 128 kbit/s WMA files. When any of these tracks is first played, a pop-up box appears asking listeners to give the band their email address in return. This was used to contact downloaders with offers on Marillion merchandise. Everyone who submitted their e-mail address is also given the option to download the tracks as 128 kbit/s MP3 files without DRM, but is asked not to share these on any networks.

Influence
Hogarth said in 2009:

Track listing
The album was originally scheduled to be just a single album.  Those tracks became "Volume 2: The Hard Shoulder."  In the middle of the recording sessions, the band experienced a major bit of inspiration and songwriting.  They decided to follow their instincts, and wound up producing what would eventually become "Volume 1: Essence."  These tracks hang together loosely as a concept, and are much mellower than the harder rocking -and non-conceptual- Volume 2.  Fans were treated to double the material, and two completely different vibes for their investment.

All music written by Marillion, lyrics by Steve Hogarth

Volume 1: Essence
 "Dreamy Street" – 2:02
 "This Train Is My Life" – 4:50
 "Essence" – 6:29
 "Wrapped Up in Time" – 5:06
 "Liquidity" – 2:12
 "Nothing Fills the Hole" – 3:23
 "Woke Up" – 3:40
 "Trap the Spark" – 5:43
 "A State of Mind" – 4:33
 "Happiness Is the Road" – 10:05
 (blank) – 1:59
 "Half-Full Jam" – 6:48 (hidden track)

Track 12 is listed as Half-Empty Jam on the download version, but was changed just prior to the CD release of the album. This could be seen as a play on words, as the lyrics of the song begin with "I used to be half empty, but now I'm half full..." Track 11 does not appear on the download version.

Volume 2: The Hard Shoulder
 "Thunder Fly" – 6:24
 "The Man from the Planet Marzipan" – 7:55
 "Asylum Satellite #1" – 9:32
 "Older Than Me" – 3:11
 "Throw Me Out" – 4:01
 "Half the World" – 5:08
 "Whatever Is Wrong with You" – 4:16
 "Especially True" – 4:37
 "Real Tears for Sale" – 7:34

Volume 1: Essence – Vinyl edition
Side one
 "Dreamy Street" – 2:02
 "This Train Is My Life" – 4:50
 "Essence" – 6:29
Side two
 "Wrapped Up in Time" – 5:06
 "Liquidity" – 2:12
 "Nothing Fills the Hole" – 3:23
 "Woke Up" – 3:40
Side three
 "Trap the Spark" – 5:43
 "A State of Mind" – 4:33
Side four
 "Happiness Is the Road" – 10:05
 "Half-Full Jam" – 6:48

Volume 2: The Hard Shoulder – Vinyl edition
Side one
 "The Man from the Planet Marzipan" – 7:55
 "Asylum Satellite #1" – 9:32
Side two
 "Thunder Fly" – 6:24
 "Whatever Is Wrong with You" – 4:16
 "Especially True" – 4:37
Side three
 "Older Than Me" – 3:11
 "Throw Me Out" – 4:01
 "Half the World" – 5:08
Side four
 "Real Tears for Sale" – 7:34
 "Nothing Fills the Hole" / "Woke Up" (Live in Cologne) – 7:32

Personnel

Band members
Steve Hogarth – vocals, keyboards
Mark Kelly – keyboards, backing vocals
Ian Mosley – drums
Steve Rothery – guitars
Pete Trewavas – bass guitar, backing vocals, guitars, clarinet on "Throw Me Out"

Additional musicians
Sam Morris – French horn on "Real Tears For Sale"
S. Claydon – Arco Bass
S. Audley – Dulcimer
P. Bisset – "Additional Tuned Percussion"
Jon Hotten – "Overworked Tambourine"
Emil Hogarth – "Ultrasound Heartbeat" on "Dreamy Street"
Dawn Roberts – Finger Cymbal on "Essence"

Production
Produced by Michael Hunter and Marillion
Recorded and Mixed by Michael Hunter
Assistant Engineers: Roderick Brunton, Jon Cameron
Mastered by Simon Heyworth
Artwork and Photography by Antonio Seijas
Graphic design and Layout by Carl Glover

References

2008 albums
Marillion albums